Charaxes (Polyura) pyrrhus is a butterfly in the family Nymphalidae. It was described by Carl Linnaeus in his 1758 10th edition of Systema Naturae. It is found in the Australasian realm including New Guinea, Australia, Timor, Moluccas.

Subspecies
C. p. pyrrhus (Buru, Ambon, Seram, Saraparua, Batjan)
C. p. sempronius (Fabricius, 1793) (Australia) 
C. p. galaxia (Butler, [1866]) (Timor, Wetar)
C. p. jovis (Staudinger, 1895) (Sumbawa)
C. p. bandanus (Rothschild, 1898) (Banda Island)
C. p. lettianus (Rothschild, 1898) (Letti)
C. p. aloranus (Rothschild, 1898) (Alor)
C. p. kalaonicus (Rothschild, 1898) (Kalao, Flores)
C. p. scipio (Rothschild, 1898) (Sumba)
C. p. babbericus (Fruhstorfer, 1903) (Babar)
C. p. antigonus(Fruhstorfer, 1904) (Sermata, Damar)
C. p. romanus (Fruhstorfer, 1904) (Romang)
C. p. tiberius (Waterhouse, 1920) (Lord Howe Island)

Biology
The larva feeds on species in the genera Acacia, Albizia, Robinia, Cassia, Celtis and Ponsiana.

References

External links
Polyura Billberg, 1820 at Markku Savela's Lepidoptera and Some Other Life Forms

Polyura
Butterflies described in 1758
Taxa named by Carl Linnaeus